The 1955 All-Ireland Junior Hurling Championship was the 34th staging of the All-Ireland Junior Championship since its establishment by the Gaelic Athletic Association in 1912.

Kerry entered the championship as the defending champions, however, they were beaten by Cork in the Munster semi-final.

The All-Ireland final was played on 2 October 1955 at Páirc na hÉireann in Birmingham, between Cork and Warwickshire, in what was their second ever meeting in the final and a first in four years. Cork won the match by 3–09 to 1–05 to claim their third championship title overall and a first tile since 1953.

Results

All-Ireland Junior Football Championship

All-Ireland semi-finals

All-Ireland home final

All-Ireland final

References

Junior
All-Ireland Junior Football Championship